Os Cascavelletes is the eponymous debut EP by Brazilian rock band Os Cascavelletes, self-released in 1988. The EP contains six tracks; three ("Menstruada", "Morte por Tesão" and "Ugagogobabagô") were re-recorded from their 1987 demo tape Vórtex Demo, while the remaining were new compositions. "Estou Amando uma Mulher" became a major hit in radios of the time after extensive airplay, while "Menstruada" was forbidden to play in radios because of its sexually explicit content. Bassist Frank Jorge parted ways with the band soon after the EP's release to focus on his alternate project Graforreia Xilarmônica.

Live bonus track "Jessica Rose" would be re-recorded for the band's subsequent release, Rock'a'ula.

"Estou Amando uma Mulher" and "Morte por Tesão" were also included in SBK Records' compilation Rio Grande do Rock, released shortly afterwards the EP.

Track listing

Personnel
 Flávio Basso – vocals, electric guitar
 Nei Van Soria – vocals, electric guitar
 Frank Jorge – bass guitar
 Alexandre "Lord" Barea – drums

References

1988 debut EPs
Os Cascavelletes albums
Self-released EPs
Obscenity controversies in music